The Établissement Français d'Enseignement Montaigne (EFE Montaigne), or the École Montaigne, is a French international school in Cotonou, Benin. It has the levels primaire (primary) through lycée (senior high school).

Its origins stretch to 1951, when the cours Montaigne was created. The school in its present form opened in 1984.

References

External links

  Établissement Français d'Enseignement Montaigne

Cotonou
French international schools in Africa
Educational institutions established in 1984
International schools in Benin
1984 establishments in Benin